Desperate Houses! is a television programme broadcast on RTÉ One. It is presented by interior designer Fiona Wilson and features the building contractor Ivan Duggan. Clodagh Conroy hosted the first series and the second series was presented by Avril Murphy Allen. The third series was an amalgamation of revisited houses from the previous two series. Each week the team helps declutter, revamp and redecorate a different home inside three days and with a budget limited to €2000. The fourth series began on 11 November 2008 and aired each Tuesday at 19:00.

Episodes

Series one
Series one has been wiped from the online records.

Series two
Series two has been wiped from the online records.

Series three
In 2007, a number of "Desperate Houses" were revisited. The first three episodes revisited the first series. The final three episodes revisited the second series.

Series four
The fourth series contained six episodes and was broadcast over November and December 2008.

References

External links
 Official site

Irish makeover television series
COCO Television
Home renovation television series